José Caballero was a Spanish painter.

José Caballero may also refer to:

Jose Caballero, martial arts practitioner
José Luis Caballero, Mexican footballer
José de la Luz y Caballero, Cuban academic
José Luis Caballero (actor)